The position of vice-president of the Republic of Burundi was created in June 1998, when a transitional constitution went into effect. It replaced the post of Prime Minister.

History of the office

Interim period (1998–2001) 
Pierre Buyoya, a former President (1987–1993) who seized power in a 1996 military coup, was sworn in as President of the Republic on 11 June 1998. He appointed Frédéric Bamvuginyumvira, a Hutu member of the Front for Democracy in Burundi (FRODEBU), as 1st vice-president. Mathias Sinamenye, a Tutsi member of Buyoya's Union for National Progress (UPRONA) party, was appointed 2nd vice-president.

According to the transitional constitution, the vice-presidency consisted of two posts: The 1st vice-president (Responsible for political and administrative affairs) and the 2nd vice-president (Responsible for economic and social affairs).

Transitional period (2001–2005) 
A new transitional power-sharing government took office on 1 November 2001. Interim president Pierre Buyoya became transitional president for a period of 18 months. At the end of his term in 2003, Hutu Vice-President Domitien Ndayizeye took office and appointed a Tutsi (Alphonse-Marie Kadege) as vice-president. In November 2004, Kadege was sacked as vice-president and replaced by Frédéric Ngenzebuhoro. Although Ndayizeye's term was due to end in late 2004 following elections, the transitional period was extended and planned elections were delayed. Elections were held in mid-2005 and the transitional period is due to end on 26 August 2005, when the newly elected president takes office.

Vice-presidency 2005–2018 
Burundi's new constitution, approved in a 28 February 2005 constitutional referendum, calls for a two-member vice-presidency (similar to that of the interim period). The 1st vice-president will be responsible for political and administrative affairs, while the 2nd vice-president will handle social and economic affairs. One vice-president will be an ethnic Hutu and the other a Tutsi. Nominees must be approved by both chambers of parliament in order to take office.

On 29 August 2005, President Pierre Nkurunziza nominated Martin Nduwimana and Alice Nzomukunda for the posts of 1st and 2nd vice-president. Both received approval from parliament and were immediately sworn in. Nzomukunda resigned on 5 September 2006. She was replaced by Marina Barampama two days later.

In February 2007, Barampama was replaced by Gabriel Ntisezerana. In November 2007, Nduwimana was replaced by Yves Sahinguvu.

In August 2010, Sahinguvu was replaced by Therence Sinunguruza and Ntisezerana was replaced by Gervais Rufyikiri.

Vice-presidency since 2018 
New constitutional amendments were approved in a 17 May 2018 constitutional referendum. The post of second vice-president will be abolished. The remaining vice-president, who will have limited powers, will be selected from a political party and ethnic group that differs from those of the President.

Key
Political parties

List of officeholders

See also

Burundi
Politics of Burundi
List of kings of Burundi
President of Burundi
List of presidents of Burundi
Prime Minister of Burundi
List of colonial governors of Ruanda-Urundi
List of colonial residents of Burundi
Martyazo
Lists of Incumbents

References

External links
Constitution of Burundi (In French)

Burundi
Government of Burundi
Burundi, Vice-Presidents of
Vice-President
 
1998 establishments in Burundi
Burundi politics-related lists